The 2010 Morehead State Eagles football team represented Morehead State University in the 2010 NCAA Division I FCS football season as a member of the Pioneer Football League (PFL). The Eagles were led by 17th-year head coach Matt Ballard and played their home games at Jayne Stadium. They finished the season 5–6, 4–4 in PFL play.

Schedule

References

Morehead State
Morehead State Eagles football seasons
Morehead State Eagles football